Levonorgestrel butanoate (LNG-B) (developmental code name HRP-002), or levonorgestrel 17β-butanoate, is a steroidal progestin of the 19-nortestosterone group which was developed by the World Health Organization (WHO) in collaboration with the Contraceptive Development Branch (CDB) of the National Institute of Child Health and Human Development as a long-acting injectable contraceptive. It is the C17β butanoate ester of levonorgestrel, and acts as a prodrug of levonorgestrel in the body. The drug is at or beyond the phase III stage of clinical development, but has not been marketed at this time. It was first described in the literature, by the WHO, in 1983, and has been under investigation for potential clinical use since then.

LNG-B has been under investigation as a long-lasting injectable contraceptive for women. A single intramuscular injection of an aqueous suspension of 5 or 10 mg LNG-B has a duration of 3 months, whereas an injection of 50 mg has a duration of 6 months. The drug was also previously tested successfully as a combined injectable contraceptive with estradiol hexahydrobenzoate, but this formulation was never marketed. LNG-B has been tested successfully in combination with testosterone buciclate as a long-lasting injectable contraceptive for men as well.

LNG-B may have several advantages over depot medroxyprogesterone acetate, including the use of much lower comparative dosages, reduced progestogenic side effects like hypogonadism and amenorrhea, and a more rapid return in fertility following discontinuation. The drug has a well-established safety record owing to the use of levonorgestrel as an oral contraceptive since the 1960s.

See also
 List of progestogen esters § Esters of 19-nortestosterone derivatives
 Progestogen-only injectable contraceptive
 Special Programme on Human Reproduction

References

Abandoned drugs
Androgens and anabolic steroids
Butyrate esters
Contraception for males
Estranes
Hormonal contraception
Prodrugs
Progestogen esters
Progestogens
World Health Organization